A Bola is a Portuguese sports newspaper published in Lisbon.

History and profile
A Bola was founded in 1945 by Cândido de Oliveira and Ribeiro dos Reis, and was then published twice a week. It became a daily newspaper in 1995. Although its subtitle is "newspaper of all sports", its content is mainly about football. Since the 1952–53 season, it hands the Bota de Prata award to the Primeira Liga top goalscorer.

It is the most popular newspaper among Portuguese emigrants abroad, and widely read in the former Portuguese colonies in Africa. From 2006, it is also printed in Newark, New Jersey an American city with a large Portuguese population.

In 2012, they launched the television channel A Bola TV.

Player of the Year

See also
 List of newspapers in Portugal

References

External links

A Bola on-line

1945 establishments in Portugal
Newspapers established in 1945
Newspapers published in Lisbon
Portuguese-language newspapers
Sports mass media in Portugal
Sports newspapers